Karl Ingvar Eriksson (1 October 1944 – 7 January 2015) was a Swedish swimmer who won two bronze medals in the freestyle relays at the 1966 European Aquatics Championships. He competed at the 1964 and 1968 Summer Olympics in four freestyle and butterfly events with the best achievement of fifth place in the 4 × 100 m freestyle relay in 1964.

References

1944 births
2015 deaths
Swedish male butterfly swimmers
Swimmers at the 1964 Summer Olympics
Swimmers at the 1968 Summer Olympics
Swedish male freestyle swimmers
Olympic swimmers of Sweden
European Aquatics Championships medalists in swimming